Lupo Quiñónez (born February 12, 1957) is a retired footballer from Ecuador, who played as a forward during his career. Lupo Quiñónez was nicknamed El Tanque de Muisne, the Tank from Muisne. Lupo Quiñónez scored 115 goals in the Ecuadorian football league.

Ecuador

1983-1989 Ecuador

Club Titles

Emelec    Campeonato Ecuatoriano 1979
Barcelona Campeonato Ecuatoriano 1985
Barcelona Campeonato Ecuatoriano 1987

Personal Titles
The top scorer in the derby Barcelona vs Emelec is Lupo Quiñónez with 13 (ten for Emelec and three for Barcelona) (Ecuador)

References

External links
FIFA Ecuador’s Shipyard Derby
REEEF

1957 births
Living people
People from Muisne
Ecuadorian footballers
Association football forwards
Ecuador international footballers
1983 Copa América players
1987 Copa América players
C.S. Emelec footballers
Barcelona S.C. footballers
S.D. Quito footballers